Bulgarian Antarctic Institute is the national Antarctic operator of Bulgaria, organizing annual Antarctic campaigns and maintaining the Bulgarian Antarctic base of St. Kliment Ohridski on Livingston Island in the South Shetland Islands.  The institute was established in 1993, and comprises several dozens individual members and few institutional ones: the Bulgarian Ministry of Foreign Affairs, Sofia University St. Kliment Ohridski , Sofia Medical University, and the Atlantic Club of Bulgaria.  Founding Chairman of the institute is Christo Pimpirev.

The Institute cooperates in Antarctic logistics and research projects with the Antarctic Programs of Spain, United Kingdom, Russia, Germany, Argentina, Brazil, Chile, South Korea etc.  The Bulgarian Antarctic Institute is a member of the Council of Managers of National Antarctic Programs (COMNAP), the Standing Committee on Antarctic Logistics and Operations (SCALOP), the European Polar Board, and the Scientific Committee on Antarctic Research (SCAR).

See also
 National Centre of Polar Research
 Antarctic Place-names Commission
 St. Kliment Ohridski Base

Notes

Bibliography 
 J. Stewart. Antarctica: An Encyclopedia. Jefferson, N.C. and London: McFarland, 2011. 1771 pp.  

 
1993 establishments in Bulgaria
Organizations established in 1993
Research institutes in Bulgaria
Sofia University